Miles Clayton Allgood (February 22, 1878 – March 4, 1977) was an American politician and a U.S. Representative from Alabama.

Biography
Born in Chepultepec (now Allgood), Blount County, Alabama, Allgood was the son of William Barnett and Mary Matilda (Ingram) Allgood. He attended the common schools of his native county and was graduated from the State Normal College at Florence, Alabama (now the University of North Alabama), in 1898. He married Willie Randall Fox on February 1, 1917; and was a cousin of Clarence William Allgood.

Career
Allgood taught school in Blount County. He became the tax assessor of Blount County, Alabama from 1900 to 1909, and was a member of the State Democratic executive committee from 1908 to 1910. He served as Blount County agricultural demonstration agent from 1910 to 1913; State auditor of Alabama from 1914 to 1918; and as State commissioner of agriculture and industries from 1918 to 1922. He was elected as a delegate at large from Alabama to the Democratic National Convention at San Francisco in 1920.

Allgood was elected as a Democrat to the Sixty-eighth Congress and to the five succeeding Congresses, and served from March 4, 1923, to January 3, 1935. He was chairman of the Committee on War Claims (Seventy-second and Seventy-third Congresses). Allgood was a proponent of establishing a minimum wage to encourage businesses to hire white workers over non-white workers who were willing to work for less, telling his fellow Congressmen he hoped a bare minimum wage law would put an end to out-of-state contractors bringing in "cheap colored labor... in competition with [local] white labor."

An unsuccessful candidate for renomination in 1934, Allgood served as a member of the Farm Security Administration from September 4, 1935, until he retired on December 1, 1943. He made an unsuccessful campaign for State treasurer in 1954 and again retired.

Death
Allgood died in Fort Payne, Alabama, March 4, 1977 (age 99 years, 10 days). He is interred at Valley Head Cemetery, Valley Head, Alabama.

References

External links

 

1878 births
1977 deaths
University of North Alabama alumni
Alabama Commissioners of Agriculture and Industries
People from Blount County, Alabama
State Auditors of Alabama
Democratic Party members of the United States House of Representatives from Alabama